Bembidion rolandi is a species of ground beetle in the subfamily Trechinae. It is found in Canada and the United States.

References

Further reading

 
 
 

rolandi
Beetles described in 1922
Beetles of North America